The London Werewolves were an independent Frontier League baseball team based in London, Ontario, Canada.  The team had previously been known as the Kalamazoo Kodiaks, from Kalamazoo, Michigan.  The team arrived in London for the 1999 season and moved after the 2001 season to Canton, Ohio where they became the Canton Coyotes. The Werewolves won the Frontier League championship in 1999.  They played their home games at Labatt Memorial Park, believed to be the oldest operating baseball grounds in the world.

The team was operated by part-owner and general manager, John Kuhn, who now is the Senior Director of Business Development for the Fort Myers Miracle Baseball Club of the Florida State League in Fort Myers, Florida.

The team was named after the Warren Zevon song Werewolves of London.  The team's mascot was a werewolf named "Warren Z. Vaughn".

Seasons
1999:  54-30  1st Place Eastern Division:

Won 1st Round Playoff 2-0 over Johnstown

Won Frontier League Championship 2-0 over Chillicothe

2000:  46-37  2nd Place Eastern Division:

Lost Eastern Division Playoff 2-0 to Johnstown

2001:  37-47  5th Place Eastern Division

References

Sports teams in London, Ontario
Defunct Frontier League teams
Defunct baseball teams in Canada
Baseball teams in Ontario
1999 establishments in Ontario
Baseball teams established in 1999
2001 disestablishments in Ontario
Defunct independent baseball league teams
Sports clubs disestablished in 2001